Tiéfora is a department or commune of Comoé Province in south-western Burkina Faso. Its capital lies at the town of Tiéfora. According to the 1996 census the department has a total population of 35,894.

Towns and villages

 Tiéfora	(4 673 inhabitants) (capital)
 Bamako	(1 383 inhabitants)
 Biton (1 429 inhabitants)
 Bondorola	(615 inhabitants)
 Boulo	(2 444 inhabitants)
 Boussanra I	(421 inhabitants)
 Boussanra Brousse	(2 654 inhabitants)
 Djandoro	(1 497 inhabitants)
 Dramandougou	(1 217 inhabitants)
 Fandiora	(1 329 inhabitants)
 Houetiara	(930 inhabitants)
 Kangounaba	(1 154 inhabitants)
 Kangounadeni	(1 521 inhabitants)
 Labola Foukara	(412 inhabitants)
 Labola Kassianra	(322 inhabitants)
 Labola Koumoussanra	(453 inhabitants)
 Labola Nambalfo	(1 025 inhabitants)
 Labola Sankrala	(825 inhabitants)
 Libora	(953 inhabitants)
 Loubora	(155 inhabitants)
 Moussoumourou	(1 108 inhabitants)
 Nadrifa	(142 inhabitants)
 Naniagara	(1 662 inhabitants)
 Sakora	(1 869 inhabitants)
 Sangora	(1 235 inhabitants)
 Sankara	(891 inhabitants)
 Saterna	(388 inhabitants)
 Sikane	(808 inhabitants)
 Sokoura	(739 inhabitants)
 Sounougou	(1 640 inhabitants)

References

Departments of Burkina Faso
Comoé Province